Levy Mokgothu is a South African professional football player for Kaizer Chiefs as a defender.

References

Living people
1989 births
South African soccer players
Kaizer Chiefs F.C. players
Association football defenders